The Abbey Brewing Company is an American craft brewing company located in the Chama River Wilderness Area near Abiquiú, New Mexico. The microbrewery was founded in 2003 as a Benedictine joint venture of Our Lady of Guadalupe monastery in Pecos, New Mexico and the Monastery of Christ in the Desert in Abiquiú. It is the first American monastery brewery founded since before the Prohibition Era. The brewery's motto is "Made with care and prayer".

The brothers maintain that: "Our focus in all our work is 'to bring everything to perfection for the glory of God' as the Rule of Saint Benedict instructs us."

History
The brewery initially focused on producing European monastic style beers with first commercial production of Monks' Ale occurring in late 2005.  By 2010, the Monastery of Christ in the Desert had bought out the interest of Our Lady of Guadalupe Monastery. While still retaining a significant financial interest in the brewery, the Monastery of Christ in the Desert sold its equity position to two private investors in 2013.  Also in 2010 the first harvest of native hops (neo mexicanus) grown at the Monastery of Christ in the Desert that are used to brew the Reserve Series of Ales was harvested.  The brewery opened the Monks' Corner Tap Room in Albuquerque, New Mexico in 2016.  Products were first exported to Taiwan in 2016 and then to Chile in 2017.

Operations
Originally, brewing operations were conducted at Our Lady of Guadalupe Monastery in Pecos, New Mexico.  In early 2012 brewing operations were legally transferred to the Monastery of Christ in the Desert.  A new, dedicated standalone brewery building was completed and commissioned in 2012 on the grounds of the Monastery of Christ in the Desert.

Brewing at both monasteries focused on, and continues to be, the development of new styles of beer and limited commercial production of small draft batches on a half barrel brewing system.  Because of the very limited access by large trucks, large scale batches are brewed under an Alternating Proprietorship In Moriarty, New Mexico on a 20 barrel brewing system.  Both bottles and draft packaging occurs at the brewery in Moriarty.

Production
The Monastery of Christ in the Desert near Abiquiú, New Mexico hosts the master brewery that is licensed by the US Department of the Treasury, Alcohol and Tobacco Tax and Trade Bureau and the New Mexico Alcohol and Gaming Division.  The licensed brewery houses a half barrel brewing system used to develop all new beers and for limited small batch production in draft.  The Abbey Brewing Company owns all of the brewing equipment on the grounds of the Monastery of Christ in the Desert. The monastery brewery was designed for flexibility and expansion to larger brewing system of up to 7 barrels. The brewery, like the Monastery, is off the electrical grid and is powered by solar panels and propane.  Water is recycled and spent grains are used for compost in the hop yard.  The brewery is located in the private living space of the community of monks and is not open for visits.

A larger production brewery is operated under an Alternating Proprietorship in Moriarty, New Mexico, where the Abbey Brewing Company directly controls the total brewing process including the formulae and brewing processes. The company maintains direct control for sourcing both ingredients and packaging.  At the Moriarty brewery, some of the major brewing equipment is owned by Abbey Brewing Company. The Moriarty brewery consists of a two vessel, 20 barrel capacity brewing system with 40 barrel fermenting vessels and brite tanks.  Current capacity for the Abbey Brewing Company at this location is 2,900 barrels per year.

In the spring 2010, several varieties of native New Mexican hops (subspecies neomexicanus) were planted on a one-quarter-acre plot at the Monastery of Christ in the Desert and the first harvest occurred in September.  In the following year, the hop yard was expanded to a half acre.  Each fall, usually in September, hops are harvested and processed by hand by the monks and guests.  Monks' Ales with the designation of Reserve are made with hops from the monastery hop yard.  When available, the monastery hops are made available on-line to homebrewers via Holy Hops, LLC on the website HolyHops.biz.

Personnel
The general manager and assistant brewer of Abbey Brewing Company is Berkeley Merchant.  He holds a chemistry degree from Bowdoin College and Master of Business Administration from Boston University.  Mr. Merchant is an Oblate of the Monastery of Christ in the Desert, a lay monk with the monastic name of Brother Barnabas, who is a practitioner of Benedictine spirituality.

The head brewer of the Abbey Brewing Company is Brad Krauss, a native of New Mexico. He holds a degree in chemistry from Rice University and has worked in New Mexico craft beer brewing for two decades, including startup work for Rio Bravo Brewing Company (Albuquerque), Wolf Canyon Brewing (Santa Fe), Isotopes Brewing Company (Albuquerque), Bogota Brewing Company (Bogota, Colombia) and La Rana Dorada Brewing (Panama City, Panama). "A 30+ year craft brewing veteran and Master BJCP Judge with over 130 medals won in international competiion," he helped them develop original recipes.

Regular brews
Monks' Ale, an Abbey Single (Enkel) Ale, first produced in 2006. Similar to a Belgian pale ale, but darker, it is medium-bodied, malt-dominant, amber/copper brew with an ABV of 5.2 percent.
Monks' Wit, a witbier (wheat beer), first produced in 2010.
Monks' Tripel, a gold light to medium-bodied Belgian tripel, first produced in 2012, with an ABV of 9.2 percent.
Monks' Dubbel, a medium-bodied Belgian dubbel, first produced in 2013, with an ABV of 6.7 percent.

Awards
Monks' Ales are infrequently entered into competition.

In 2014, the Abbey Brewing Company won 1 gold, 1 silver, and 2 bronze medals in the New Mexico State Fair Beer Pro-Am competition. The gold was awarded to their limited specialty brew, Monks' Tripel Reserve.

In 2014 Abbey Brewing Company won a silver medal at the Denver International Beer Competition

In 2017 Abbey Brewing Company was awarded a gold medal for Monks' Ale at the Copa de Cervezas de las Américas in Santiago, Chile as well as a gold medal for Monks' Ale for Best of Class – Trappist Style Ales, as well as a bronze medal for the Monk' Dubbel.

See also

List of breweries in New Mexico
List of microbreweries

References

Notes

Citations

Sources

Further reading

External links

Beer brewing companies based in New Mexico
Buildings and structures in Rio Arriba County, New Mexico
Order of Saint Benedict
Roman Catholic Archdiocese of Santa Fe
American companies established in 2005
Food and drink companies established in 2005
2005 establishments in New Mexico
Tourist attractions in Rio Arriba County, New Mexico